The Thunderbird Classic was a golf tournament on the PGA Tour from 1962 to 1968. It was played at two locations, the Upper Montclair Country Club in Clifton, New Jersey in 1962 and 1966–68 and the Westchester Country Club in Rye, New York in 1963–65.

Winners

References

Former PGA Tour events
Golf in New Jersey
Golf in New York (state)
Recurring sporting events established in 1962
Recurring sporting events disestablished in 1968
1962 establishments in New Jersey
1968 disestablishments in New Jersey